The Born to Die Tour was the first concert tour by American singer-songwriter Lana Del Rey, in support of her major-label debut Born to Die. The tour began on November 4, 2011, at The Ruby Lounge in Manchester, England and ended on September 25, 2012, at the Roundhouse in London, England. The tour visited 13 countries in three different continents (Europe, North America and Oceania, respectively).

Background 
Lana Del Rey first announced the Born to Die Tour in August and September 2011, at the time featuring a schedule of just four shows at very small venues. However, after the shows sold out in a shorter amount of time than expected, the original four shows were postponed and moved to larger venues, along with the announcement of more dates. On September 14, 2011, prior to the beginning of the tour, Del Rey headlined a secret concert at the Glasslands Gallery under the name "Queen of Coney Island".

Setlist 
The setlist varied slightly on certain dates.

2011 setlist 
This is the setlist from December 7 in West Hollywood, California. Del Rey performed 8 songs from Born to Die and one unreleased song. The setlist varied slightly on different dates.

 Without You
 Born to Die
 Blue Jeans
 Million Dollar Man
 Radio
 Summertime Sadness
 Video Games
 You Can Be the Boss
 Off to the Races

2012 setlist 
This is the setlist from July 26 in Sydney, Australia. Del Rey performed 9 songs from Born to Die, one from Paradise and one cover. The setlist varied slightly on different dates.

 Blue Jeans
 Body Electric
 Born to Die
 Summertime Sadness
 Without You
 Million Dollar Man
 Heart-Shaped Box (Nirvana cover)
 Carmen
 Video Games
 Radio
 National Anthem

Shows

Cancelled shows

Notes

References 

Lana Del Rey concert tours
Concert tours of Europe
Concert tours of North America
Concert tours of Oceania
Concert tours of the United Kingdom
Concert tours of France
Concert tours of the Netherlands
Concert tours of Germany
Concert tours of Canada
Concert tours of the United States
Concert tours of Spain
Concert tours of Norway
Concert tours of Belgium
Concert tours of Switzerland
Concert tours of Portugal
Concert tours of Australia
2011 concert tours
2012 concert tours